Ganjafruz Rural District is a rural district (dehestan) in the Central District of Babol County, Mazandaran Province, Iran. At the 2006 census, its population was 22,792, in 6,095 families. The rural district has 11 villages.

References 

Rural Districts of Mazandaran Province
Babol County